Frederick Roberts (9 October 1909 – January 1979) was an English professional footballer who played as a forward in the Football League for Birmingham and Luton Town.

Roberts was born in Greets Green, West Bromwich, Staffordshire. He signed for Birmingham in 1933, and in his first season, 1933–34, was the club's top scorer, though with only eight goals in a struggling side. The following season, he moved to Luton Town where he remained until 1945, making 180 appearances in the Football League and helping the club to the championship of the Third Division South in the 1936–37 season. During the Second World War Roberts remained at Luton, but played wartime guest football for other clubs, including Watford. After leaving Luton he had three seasons at Kettering Town. He died in Luton at the age of 69.

Honours
with Birmingham
 Top goalscorer: 1933–34
with Luton Town
 Third Division South champions: 1936–37

References

1909 births
Sportspeople from West Bromwich
1979 deaths
English footballers
Association football forwards
Birmingham City F.C. players
Luton Town F.C. players
Kettering Town F.C. players
Watford F.C. wartime guest players